Maarten Martens (born 2 July 1984) is a Belgian former professional footballer who played as a midfielder, either as an attacking midfielder or winger. Martens was known for his flair, dribbling and goalscoring ability as well as his precise passing and creativity. He previously played for Belgian clubs Anderlecht and Cercle Brugge, Dutch clubs RKC Waalwijk and AZ, as well as Greek club PAOK. At international level, he has represented the Belgium national team.

Early career
Born in Eeklo, Maarten Martens took his first steps in football in Klauwaerts Bassevelde. At the age of eight young Martens joined the youth team of RSC Anderlecht. There, over the years he was a teammate of, among others, Urko Pardo, Mark De Man and Xavier Chen. In 2003 Roda showed interest in the young midfielder, but he decided to stay in the team of his heart. In the 2003–04 season, Martens joined the first team, but he did not have many chances to prove himself. Only once under the coach Hugo Broos played at the highest level.

Club career

RKC Waalwijk
Martens' improvement made Anderlecht loan him to another club. Over a year RKC Waalwijk wanted the 20-year-old midfielder so it signed on a year loan. Martens, both as a midfield and winger, improves tremendously in his first season. In the summer of 2005 the club bought him from Anderlecht for a three-year contract. Football journalist Johan Derksen said at that time in one of its VI -columns that Martens is a fantastic footballer and will enjoy playing for Waalwijk.

AZ
In the summer of 2006, Martens moved like his compatriot Mousa Dembélé from AZ. It was Louis van Gaal who noticed the young talents. Martens improved even further under Van Gaal instructions. With AZ he had a key role to the struggle for the league title.

On 28 October 2007 Martens had his first injury. This severe injury kept him outside for a long time. Only in the 2008/09 season Martens went back into the first team. He played almost every match in that season and attracted the attention of the Italian giant Juventus. But the Belgian midfielder remained in the Netherlands and won the championship with AZ. A year later, Martens made his first appearance in the UEFA Champions League.

In April 2011 Martens was the victim of a charge from his compatriot and former teammate Gill Swerts. On his return in August 2011 Martens immediately scored an important goal in the match against PSV. Two weeks later, Martens was injured again. Only in December 2011, he succeeded to come back in the first team.
In August 2012, after the departure of Niklas Moisander and Rasmus Elm, Martens became the captain of the club. Martens played the first few games of the season, but after a serious knee injury missed the rest of the season.

PAOK
On 15 January 2014, Martens signed a contract with Superleague Greece team PAOK FC until 30 June 2016. After a year with PAOK, Maartens signed on loan with Belgian club Cercle Brugge for the rest of the 2014-15 season, but after the relegation of the club he returned to PAOK. On 5 August 2015, Martens reached an agreement with PAOK to terminate his contract with the club.

International career
While Martens played for RKC earned the interest of Jean-François De Sart. He became the captain of the Belgium U21
team. Over the years the young midfielder was part of a strong generation of players like Vincent Kompany, Marouane Fellaini, Jan Vertonghen, Thomas Vermaelen and Mousa Dembélé. Was elected  for the U-21 European Championships in 2007. The young Belgians reached the semifinals and promoted to the Olympic Games of 2008.
At the Olympics Belgium promoted from Group C along with Brazil through to the quarterfinals. Belgium surprisingly won Italy to the quarterfinals by 3–2. In the semi-final against Nigeria, Belgium lost 4–1. In the game for the bronze medal Brazil defeated the young Red Devils 3–0.
The good performance of the young Devils stood in contrast to the poor results of the first team. Many players, among Martens, from this team after the Olympic Games  were promoted to the first team, but Martens throughout the years did not manage to receive a permanent call. But, he is up to date the player with the most appearances in the Belgium U21 team.
Martens made on 7 February 2007 his debut with Belgium. It was coach Rene Vandereycken who selected him for the first time. After his debut Martens was barely called for the national team following several injuries. In 2009, Frank Vercauteren, called him for the Kirin Cup in Japan. In 2010, under the coaching of Dick Advocaat, made his last international match replacing Wesley Sonck.

Managerial career
In May 2021 Martens started his first job as head coach in Alkmaar, with Jong AZ, after he already worked in the youth of Club Brugge as an assistant coach.

Career statistics

Club

Honours
AZ
Eredivisie: 2008–09
KNVB Cup: 2012–13
Johan Cruijff Shield: 2009

External links

References

1984 births
Living people
People from Eeklo
Footballers from East Flanders
Belgian footballers
Association football midfielders
R.S.C. Anderlecht players
RKC Waalwijk players
AZ Alkmaar players
PAOK FC players
Cercle Brugge K.S.V. players
Belgian Pro League players
Eredivisie players
Super League Greece players
Belgium youth international footballers
Belgium under-21 international footballers
Olympic footballers of Belgium
Belgium international footballers
Footballers at the 2008 Summer Olympics
Belgian expatriate footballers
Belgian expatriate sportspeople in the Netherlands
Belgian expatriate sportspeople in Greece
Expatriate footballers in the Netherlands
Expatriate footballers in Greece
Belgian football managers
Eerste Divisie managers
Belgian expatriate football managers
Expatriate football managers in the Netherlands